Bike for Three! is a "cross-continental collaboration" between Canadian alternative hip hop artist Buck 65 (born Rich Terfry) and Belgian producer Greetings from Tuskan (born Joëlle Phuong Minh Lê).

History
Their debut album, More Heart Than Brains, was released on Anticon in 2009.

While Buck 65 and Greetings from Tuskan have ongoing solo efforts, they say the band "should not be thought of as a side-project," and the album "NOT a one-off affair." Though the two have never met in person, they have been making music since 2007 after meeting through MySpace, and the album has been "finished" since June 2008. The album marks the first time that a Buck 65 album features completely electronic production.

Their second album, So Much Forever, was released on Fake Four Inc. on February 11, 2014.

Discography
 More Heart Than Brains (Anticon, 2009)
 So Much Forever (Fake Four Inc., 2014)

References

External links
 Bike for Three! on Myspace

Canadian electronic music groups
Musical groups from Halifax, Nova Scotia
Musical groups established in 2007
Anticon artists
Hip hop duos
2007 establishments in Nova Scotia